The 2009 IIHF World U18 Championships were held in Fargo, North Dakota and Moorhead, Minnesota, United States. The championships ran from April 9 to April 19, 2009. Games were played at the Urban Plains Center in Fargo and the Moorhead Sports Center in Moorhead. Fargo-Moorhead defeated Providence, Rhode Island and St. Cloud, Minnesota for the rights to host the event.

The United States, as the host country, won their third gold medal in five years, defeating Russia 5–0 in the final. Finland rounded out the podium with a 5–4 shootout win over Canada in the bronze medal game.

Top Division

Preliminary Round

Group A

Group B

Relegation round

Results
Note: The following matches from the preliminary round carry forward to the relegation round:
April 10, 2009:  5-4 
April 14, 2009:  8–3

Final round

Quarterfinals

Semifinals

Fifth place game

Bronze medal game

Gold medal game

Final standings

Leading scorers

Top goaltenders

Division I 

The following teams took part in the Division I tournament. Group A was played in Minsk, Belarus between April 6 and April 12, 2009. Group B was played in Asiago, Italy between March 29 and April 5, 2009.

Group A 

 is promoted to Top Division for the 2010 IIHF World U18 Championships. 
 is relegated to Division II for the 2010 IIHF World U18 Championships.

Group B 

 is promoted to Top Division for the 2010 IIHF World U18 Championships. 
 is relegated to Division II for the 2010 IIHF World U18 Championships.

Division II 

The following teams took part in the Division II tournament. Group A was played in Maribor, Slovenia between March 22 and March 28, 2009. Group B was played in Narva, Estonia between March 16 and March 22, 2009:

Group A 

 is promoted to Division I for the 2010 IIHF World U18 Championships. 
 is relegated to Division III for the 2010 IIHF World U18 Championships.

Group B

 is promoted to Division I for the 2010 IIHF World U18 Championships. 
 is relegated to Division III for the 2010 IIHF World U18 Championships.

Division III 

The following teams took part in the Division III tournament. Group A was played in Taipei, Taiwan (Republic of China) between February 27 and March 5, 2009. Group B was played in Erzurum, Turkey between March 9 and March 15, 2009:

Group A 

 is promoted to Division II for the 2010 IIHF World U18 Championships.

Group B 

 is promoted to Division II for the 2010 IIHF World U18 Championships.

See also
2009 IIHF World U18 Championship Division I
2009 IIHF World U18 Championship Division II
2009 IIHF World U18 Championship Division III
2009 World Junior Ice Hockey Championships
2009 World U-17 Hockey Challenge

References

External links 

 2009 IIHF U18 Hockey Championship – Fargo-Moorhead Official website

 
IIHF World U18 Championships
U18 Championships
IIHF World U18 Championships
2009
World
April 2009 sports events in the United States